San Marcos station is an intermodal transit center in San Marcos, Texas with primary ridership towards Dallas–Fort Worth. 19.4% of ridership commutes locally. 12.5% of embarking riders travel as far as Chicago, with a minority of this segment alternatively traveling to Los Angeles.

It is served by Amtrak's Texas Eagle line as well as Capital Area Rural Transportation System and Greyhound Lines buses.

References

External links

San Marcos, TX – Texas Eagle (Amtrak)
San Marcos Amtrak Station (USA Rail Guide -- Train Web)
Capital Area Rural Transportation System

Amtrak stations in Texas
Buildings and structures in San Marcos, Texas
Transportation in Hays County, Texas
Railway stations in the United States opened in 2001